Saint Stanislaus or Saint Stanisław may refer to:

 Stanislaus of Szczepanów (1030–79), bishop and martyr
 Stanisław Kazimierczyk (1433–89), canon regular
 Stanislaus Kostka (1550–68), Jesuit

See also 
 St. Stanislaus Church (disambiguation)
 Order of Saint Stanislaus (disambiguation)
 Stanislav (disambiguation)